St. Margaret's Church, Aspley is a parish church in the Church of England in Aspley, Nottingham.

History
St Margaret's was built in 1936 by E. H. Heazell.

In 2018, St Margaret's was designated a "resourcing church" and welcomed a new vicar.

Organ
The pipe organ was installed by Rushworth and Dreaper in 1936.
The organ has since been removed.

References

External links
See St. Margaret's Church on Google Street View

Aspley
Churches completed in 1936
Aspley
20th-century Church of England church buildings